A New World Record is the sixth studio album by Electric Light Orchestra (ELO). It was released in October 1976 on United Artists Records in the U.S., and on 19 November 1976 on Jet Records in the United Kingdom. A New World Record marked ELO's shift towards shorter pop songs, a trend which would continue across their career.

Their second album to be recorded at Musicland Studios in Munich, the LP proved to be the band's breakthrough in the UK; after their previous three studio recordings failed to chart in their home market, A New World Record became their first top ten album in the UK. It became a global success and reached multi-platinum status in the US and UK. The album sold five million units worldwide within its first year of release. The cover art features the ELO logo, designed by Kosh, for the first time; this logo would be included on most of the group's subsequent releases. The album yielded four hit singles, including "Livin' Thing", the transatlantic Top Ten hit "Telephone Line", which became the band's first gold US single, the UK Top Ten hit "Rockaria!", and the US number 24 hit "Do Ya", a remake of the 1972 single by The Move, of which Lynne was a member between 1970 and 1972.

In 1977, four of the album's songs were featured on the soundtrack of the film Joyride. In 2006, the album was remastered and released with bonus tracks on Sony's Epic/Legacy imprint. "Surrender" was also issued as a promotional single and an iTunes download single, which entered the top 100 download chart. The track was originally written in 1976 for a cancelled film soundtrack and was finished in 2006. In July 2012, the all vinyl record company Music on Vinyl re-released A New World Record on 180 gram vinyl with an embossed cover.

Background

The band's frontman Jeff Lynne regarded his own songwriting at this point to have reached a new high.

– Jeff Lynne 2006; A New World Record remaster

Patti Quatro, Brie Brandt (both of Fanny) and Addie Lee sang uncredited backing vocals on the album.

Critical reception

The album was well received by the music press. In the UK, Harry Doherty of Melody Maker recalled that when Lynne and Roy Wood had formed ELO it was to create "a group that would merge the excitement and colour of rock and roll with the clear lines of classical music", and that "A New World Record is, I feel, the closest that the Electric Light Orchestra have come to realising this". In his opinion the album "takes a giant leap forward... the most striking progression on this album is the use of orchestra and choir. Strings are no longer a novelty." In conclusion, Doherty stated that "A New World Record is ELO's best album in its seven-year history, the most complete of them all. They're a band who haven't yet gained the attention in this country that they deserve. Acquiring this album would be a fine way to change all that." NMEs Bob Edmands complimented Lynne's songwriting, saying, "This is, in fact, a very ambitious album, possibly the most sophisticated the band have put out. But random experiments are no way to crack the States or to stay in favour there, and the complexity on this set is all in the service of strong melodic songs." Edmands also agreed with Doherty that ELO deserved to be recognised as a major outfit in the UK, saying, "Lynne and his band are in the front rank of the nation's rock experts, and it's time their standing was properly acknowledged at home".

Robin Smith of Record Mirror said, "Combining electric guitars with highbrow symphonies is a pretty crazy combination, but for the ELO it works. Often the music borders on clumsiness and the lyrics are sometimes silly, but the band's sense of fun carries them through." Tim Lott of Sounds declared that "with A New World Record Lynne has captured the essential atmosphere of sophisticated pop without sounding overblown or cheap. Each of the nine tracks is immediate, commercial, professional." He noted some minor failings with the record, but that they were outweighed by the album's positive aspects, and concluded, "There ain't a duff track anywhere. And trying to balance the superlatives with useless nitpicking and the 'relevance' of supposed old farts like Lynne would be sheer crap."

In the U.S. Alan Niester had some reservations in his review for Rolling Stone, feeling that the record was something of a "treading of the creative waters" and that the group were at that point "a band, now peaking in popularity, that is attempting to supply audiences with exactly the sound they want to hear". However, Niester then went on to note that "Lynne has always been rather deft with the melodic hook, and both 'Livin' Thing' and 'So Fine' are irresistible additions to his list of catchiest tunes. Numbers like 'Mission (A World Record)' and 'Shangri-la' continue the history of classy orchestral stylings that really rock." He concluded, "By Christmas, A New World Record should be a staple in a million homes". Robert Christgau stated that it was the album that changed his mind about the band, who he said had "made a Moody Blues album with brains, hooks, and laffs galore".

In his retrospective review for AllMusic Bruce Eder compared A New World Record with ELO's follow-up, the double album Out of the Blue, and felt that the former album was the better of the two, being "a more modest-sized creation chock full of superb songs that are produced even better... A New World Record contains seven of the best songs ever to come out of the group. The Beatles influence is present, to be sure, but developed to a very high degree of sophistication and on Lynne's own terms, rather than being imitative of specific songs."

Cash Box said that "the album holds together, with haunting cuts like 'Above The Clouds' juxtaposed against faster numbers like 'Tightrope.'"

Track listing

The cassette tape version consisted of "Tightrope", "Rockaria!", "Mission", and "Shangri-La" on side one, with side two the same as the LP version's side two except for "Telephone Line" at the end in place of "Shangri-La".

Personnel
 Jeff Lynne – lead vocals, guitars, percussion, electric piano
 Bev Bevan – drums, percussion, backing vocals
 Richard Tandy – keyboards and synthesizers, guitar, percussion, backing vocals
 Kelly Groucutt – bass guitar, percussion, backing vocals, lead vocals
 Mik Kaminski – violin
 Hugh McDowell – cello, percussion
 Melvyn Gale – cello

Additional personnel
 Mary Thomas – operatic vocals
 Patti Quatro – uncredited backing vocals
 Brie Brandt – uncredited backing vocals
 Addie Lee – uncredited backing vocals
 Mack – engineer
 Orchestra and choral arrangements – Louis Clark, Jeff Lynne, Richard Tandy
 Orchestra conducted by Louis Clark
 Duane Scott – Engineer for USA edit

Charts

Weekly charts

Year-end charts

Certifications

References

1976 albums
Albums produced by Jeff Lynne
Electric Light Orchestra albums
Epic Records albums
Jet Records albums
United Artists Records albums